Emily Janiga (born March 4, 1994) is an American ice hockey player currently playing for the Metropolitan Riveters in the Premier Hockey Federation.

Playing career

NCAA

Janiga played for Mercyhurst University from the 2012–13 season until the 2015–16 season. She made an immediate impact on the team, with a hat trick in her second game. She ended her Freshman year with the second most goals in the conference, and was named to the All-CHA Rookie team. As a sophomore, she was named to the All-CHA First team. In her junior season at Mercyhurst University, she was named the College Hockey America Conference (CHA) Player of the Year, she was the conference scoring leader, and a member of the All-CHA First Team. She was the captain of the Mercyhurst team during her Junior and Senior years. During her collegiate career, she scored 151 points (72 Goals, 79 Assists) in 141 games, attend 3 NCAA Final 8 tournaments and 2 NCAA Frozen Four tournaments. She wrapped up her career at Mercyhurst University by earning Female Athlete of the Year her senior year (2016).

Professional career

Back when the PHF was known as the NWHL, the Buffalo Beauts of the NWHL secured rights to Janiga in the inaugural league draft. She was the 16th player picked in that draft. She signed with the Beauts shortly after finishing her collegiate career in May 2016. The following year, Janiga signed with the Vanke Rays of the Canadian Women's Hockey League but returned to the Beauts in July 2018.

International play

USA Hockey

Janiga was an invitee to the Team USA Women's National Festival in Lake Placid, NY and was apart of the National Team program for 2 years. Janiga made the 4 Nations Cup Roster in 2015 but unfortunately suffered an injury a few days before the tournament.

Career statistics

NCAA

National Women's Hockey League (NWHL)

Provincial Women’s Hockey League (PWHL)
https://www.eliteprospects.com/player/389666/emily-janiga

Season	GP	G	A	Pts
2010-11 Burlington Barracudas PWHL (W)	36	19	22	41 
2011-12 Burlington Barracudas “C” PWHL (W)	34	27	21	48

Awards and honors
2013 All-CHA Rookie Team
2014 All-CHA First Team
2015 All-CHA First Team
2015 CHA Player of the Year
2016 Mercyhurst University Female Athlete of the Year 
Mercyhurst Women’s Hockey Captain 2014/15, 2015/16 Season

References

https://teamusa.usahockey.com/news_article/show/559647

https://bleacherreport.com/articles/1395971-top-10-ncaa-womens-ice-hockey-rookies-for-2012-13

External links
 
 
 Emily Janiga at Mercyhurst Athletics
 

1994 births
Living people
American women's ice hockey forwards
Ice hockey players from New York (state)
People from East Aurora, New York
Mercyhurst Lakers women's ice hockey players
Buffalo Beauts players
Vanke Rays players
Professional Women's Hockey Players Association players
Metropolitan Riveters players

https://colonialshockey.org/girls/